Lyonnaise or Lyonnais may refer to:

 Lyonnais (masculine) and Lyonnaise (feminine), something from or relating to Lyon, a city in France
 Gaule Lyonnaise, French name of Gallia Lugdunensis, a province of the Roman Empire
 Lyonnais, a historical province of France
 Lyonnaise cuisine
 Lyonnaise, cooked with onions
 Lyonnaise potatoes
 Sauce lyonnaise
 Lyonnaise (grape), another name for the Swiss wine grape Räuschling

See also
 Boule lyonnaise, a boules-type game
 Lyonesse (disambiguation)